Ceratoperidiniaeceae is a family of unarmored dinoflagellates in the order Gymnodiniales, first described in 2013. The family is named for the first described species, Ceratoperidinium margalefii. Members of the family were found to have morphological similarities, particularly the acrobase structure which was found to be common among the species included in the family. Member species possess chloroplasts.

References

Taxa described in 2013
Gymnodiniales
Dinoflagellate families